Martín Raúl Barlocco Canale (born 19 December 1977, in Montevideo) is a Uruguayan football goalkeeper who currently plays for Rocha in the Uruguayan Segunda División.

Club career
Martín Barlocco goalkeeper began his career with Fénix in 1999 and played there until 2000. He then went to El Tanque Sisley from 2000 to 2001. He moved to Iran in 2007 and played for Bargh Shiraz in Iran Pro League for one season.

Career statistics

Club
Last Update  2 May 2010

References

External links
 Profile in PersianLeague
 Martín Barlocco at BDFA.com.ar 

1977 births
Living people
Uruguayan footballers
Association football goalkeepers
Uruguayan Primera División players
Uruguayan Segunda División players
Categoría Primera A players
Centro Atlético Fénix players
Deportes Quindío footballers
Club Atlético River Plate (Montevideo) players
El Tanque Sisley players
Rampla Juniors players
Bargh Shiraz players
Mes Rafsanjan players
Rocha F.C. players
Atenas de San Carlos players
Deportivo Maldonado players
Uruguayan expatriate footballers
Expatriate footballers in Colombia
Expatriate footballers in Iran